Sisir Kumar Das (1936–2003) was a linguist, poet, playwright, translator, comparatist and a prolific scholar of Indian literature. He is considered by many as the "doyen of Indian literary historiographers". Almost singlehandedly Das built an integrated history of Indian literature composed of many languages, a task that had seemed to many important scholars of Indian literature to be “a historian’s despair”. His three volumes (among proposed ten volumes) A History of Indian Literature (Western Impact: Indian Response 1800–1910; Struggle for Freedom: Triumph and Tragedy 1911–1956; From Courtly to Popular 500–1399) is credited for having devised hitherto absent methods necessary for situating diverse Indian literary cultures in history. Apart from this, another monumental work in Das’ scholarly oeuvre is the multi-volume English Writings of Rabindranath Tagore, edited by him.

Despite his formal training in Bangla language and literature, Das was amongst the few who were instrumental in shaping the discipline of Comparative Literature in India. "I," Das once remarked, "have been trying to say this [that "compartmentalized literary-education" should be immediately done away with] for a long time. Whether study of literature or reading of literature, call it whatever, would remain incomplete if not approached comparatively. It is like that old saying: What does he know of English who only English knows. The literature departments have erected walls between literatures. New thoughts would start blowing only when these walls are shattered down."

Apart from being a profoundly erudite scholar, Das was also (and he would have liked to say, primarily) a poet and playwright in Bangla. Having spent most of his professional life in Delhi, away from the mainstream of Bengali cultural life, he did not get the kind of recognition that he deserved as a writer of Bangla. Although he was awarded the prestigious Rabindra Puraskar by the Government of West Bengal twice (for The Shadow of the Cross in 1976 and for The Artist in Chains in 1987), it was for his scholarly rather than literary works. Despite all these, his collection of poetry entitled Abalupta Chaturtha Charan (The Disappeared Fourth Line), published in his own beautiful handwriting, remains a major work in 20th century Bangla poetry. Several of his plays have been performed by the famous theatre group Bahuroopi.

Life and works

Sisir Kumar Das was born in November 1936. His father was Mukunda Chandra Das and mother Sarala Das. Das graduated from Presidency College, Calcutta with Bengali Honours in 1955. The year 1956 witnessed the publication of his first collection of verses entitled Janmalagna. In 1957 he completed his master' in Bengali from the University of Calcutta with a first-class first degree. From 1958 to 1960 he taught at West Bengal Education Service. He taught for three years (1960–63) at the School of Oriental and African Studies, London. He got his doctorate degree by simultaneously submitting two completely different theses at the University of Calcutta and the University of London in 1963.  After returning to India he started teaching at the newly formed Department of Modern Indian Languages and Literary Studies in Delhi University from 1963 onwards. He held the distinguished post of Tagore Professor from 1980 to 2001. He also remained the president of the Comparative Literature Association of India (CLAI) from 1999 until his untimely death in 2003.

Das used to say that writing in English was not his choice but a compulsion. Though some of his major scholarly works are in English, he wrote extensively in Bangla. All his literary works are almost without exception written in Bangla. Some of his most important literary and scholarly experiments like Aloukik Sanglap (Unearthly Dialogues), situated at the crossroad of several literary genres, is in Bangla. Throughout his life, he never stopped writing for children. His first collection of rhymes for children, Sonar Pakhi, came out in 1959. In the same year his first book of essays, Madhusudaner Kobimanas, was also published.
 
A comparatist by profession and inclination, Das was also what classical Comparative Literature vocabulary calls an "intermediary". It was Das' translations of ancient Greek poets, playwrights, and philosophers, produced directly from Classical Greek to Bangla, that inaugurated in Bangla literary culture a renewed interest in the literatures of western antiquity. These dialogues between two literary cultures distant in time and space found their best expression in Aloukik Sanglap, which consisted of imaginary conversations between Kalidasa and Aristotle or Parashuram and Orestes etc.  In the meanwhile several such dialogues were being formed in his mind which made their way into some of his scholarly writings. From the late 1970s Das started publishing a series of articles on the Bhakti movement and literature formed out of it, exhibiting a coherent way of approaching the various Indian literary cultures by pointing out their constant contact and exchange with each other. Methods formulated out of this understanding of the dynamics of Indian literature during the Bhakti movement served later as key concepts in his comprehensive historiography of Indian literature. Earlier histories of Indian literature, written mainly by Indologists, concentrated almost exclusively on the Sanskrit and occasionally Pali and Prakrit literary cultures. The history of the deshi Indian literature (often called Bhasha literature), on the other hand, remained limited as they avoided pointing out the exchanges that one Indian language-literary culture made with the neighboring ones.  An integrated history of Indian literature remained unwritten until Sahitya Akademi undertook the project and Das was entrusted with the task. Though the task was interrupted by Das' sudden death (only three of the proposed ten volumes have come out), the published three volumes still remain the only of their kind. The amount of labor that went into their making can be somewhat vouched from this statement of Das:

"This [A History of Indian Literature 1800–1910 ; Western Impact: Indian Response] is not a product of a man of leisure. I worked when people usually rested or relaxed."

But given the scholarly modesty Das was known for, he hastily added:

"It has been possible because of the labours of my predecessors in the field. I offer my homage to their hallowed memory…I earnestly hope my critics will not be merely engaged in finding faults and fallacies in this work- they must be too many- but will produce a much better history of Indian literatures replacing it."

Das died on 7 May 2003 in Delhi at the age of sixty-seven.

Sisir Kumar Das Memorial Lecture

The Sisir Kumar Das Memorial Lecture is delivered by a distinguished scholar as a part of each biennial conference of the Comparative Literature Association of India (CLAI)

Awards

Nehru Prize from the Federal Republic of Germany (1970,)
Philippines Amodiesa of National Language (1974),
Rabindra Puraskar for The Shadow of the Cross (1976) and The Artist in Chains (1987),
Sudhamoyee Smriti Padak from the University of Calcutta (1996),
Kamalkumaree Smriti Puraskar (1995),
Honored as a distinguished playwright by Paschimbanga Natya Akademi (1995),
Honored by Tagore Research Institute (1996).

Publications (Bengali)

Poetry
Janmalagna (1956),
Hoyto Darja Ache Anyadike (1986),
Abalupta Chaturtha Charan (1986),
Bajpakhir Sange Kichukkhon (1992).

For children
Sonar Pakhi (1959),
Taray Taray (1960),
Argos (1993),
Michael (1994),
Chingri (1994),
Chand Mama o Bagher Masi (2001).

Plays
Jhad (1970),
Surjaster Por (1970),
Ekti Mritodeho (1972),
He Durbhikkha, He Banya (1972),
Banglar Mukh (1971),
Chandrahas (1973),
Socrates-er Jobanbondi (1975),
Socrateser Sandhan (1983),
Bhnaru Dutta (1977),
Parashuram (1980),
Adim Andhakar (1985),
Muchiram Gur (1991),
Puraskar Prahasanam (1990),
Tulpule Antardhan Rahasya (1991),
Shyama (1996),
Bagh (1996),
Natok Shurur Natok (1993), 
Satyameba Jayate (1994),
Akbar-Birbal (1995),
Sinduk (1996),
Aloukik Sanglap (1996),
Bhaluker Hasi (1996),
Khela (1996),
Purush Purush Korchho Kare,
Salmaner Tarabari (1997),
Sakuntala (2000),
Ekdin Ekratri (1999),
Dom Antonio (2000),
Andhabuddha (2000),
Maunabhanga (2001),
Bibaha Mandap Prahasan (2000),
Ekti Kukur o Koyekjon Manush (2000),
Dadaji, Amra Kon Partyr Lok (2003).

Collection of essays
Madhusudaner Kobimanas (1959),
Bangla Chhotogolpo (1961),
Chaturdashee (1966),
Gadya o Padyer Dwanda (1985),
Bitarkita Atithi (1985),
Shashwata Mouchak (1987), 
Kobitar Mil o Aumil (1987),
Pathyakram o Sahitya (1992),
Bhasha Jijnasa (1992),
Phooler Phasal (Samkalaner Rajneeti) (1998),
Moder Gorob, Moder Asha (1999),
Bharat Sahitya Katha (1999), 
Shaswata Mouchak: Rabindranath o Spain,

Translations

Plays
Ahuti, Euripides’ Iphigeneia at Aulis’;
Byatikram o Niyam, Brecht’s “The Exception and the Rule”;
Antigone, Sophocles’ Antigone;
Bandini, Euripides’ Trojan Women;
Raja Oidipous, Sophocles’ Oedipus the King;

Poetry
Bahujuger Opar Hote,
Nirbachita Kobita: Selected Poems of the Chinese poet Ai Ching,
Nirbachita Kobita: Selected Poems of the Greek Poet George Seferis,
Kalo Meyer Panchali, a long ballad by the Chinese poet Ai Ching,
Prachin Nabiker Panchali (translation of The Rime of the Ancient Mariner),
Thammar Wool Bona (translated from the English version of Uri Orlev’s Hebrew poem: Grenny Krits).

Prose
Akbar (translated from Lawrence Binyon’s biographical essay Akbar);
Bidyutgati Adhiyan (D. K Palit’s The Lightening Campaign);
Kabyatattwa (Aristotle’s Peri Poetikes);

Edited works
Shashibhushan Dasgupta Smarak Grantha,
Shatayu Sukumar,
Michael Madhusudan Dutta: Nirbachita Rachana,
Samsad Bangla Sahityasangee.

Publications (English)

Comparative Literature: Theory and Practice (co-edited with Amiya Dev);
The English Writings of Rabindranath Tagore; 
A History of Indian Literature: 1800–1910, Western Impact, Indian Response;
A History of Indian Literature: 1910–1956, Triumph and Tragedy;
A History of Indian Literature: 500–1399 AD, From Courtly to Popular;
Indian Ode to the West Wind: Studies in Literary Encounters; 
Selected Writings on Literature and Language by Rabindranath Tagore (co-edited with Sukanta Chaudhuri, Sankha Ghosh);
Studies in Comparative Literature: Theory, Culture and Space (co-edited with Jansi Jayims);
Early Bengali Prose;
The Artist in Chains;
Ancient and Modern;
The Polyphony of the Bhakti Movement;
Sahibs and Munshis;
The Shadow of the Cross;
Structure of Malto;
Western Sailors, Eastern Seas;
The Mad Lover;
An Indian Ode to the Westwind;
The Controversial Guest: Tagore In China.

References

External links 
 http://www.bookfinder.com/author/sisir-kumar-das/
 https://books.google.com/books?id=sqBjpV9OzcsC&printsec=frontcover&dq=sisir+kumar+das&hl=en&sa=X&ei=J5ZWUdzDI9GsrAfXwoGwDw&ved=0CDIQ6AEwAA
 https://books.google.com/books?id=BC3l1AbPM8sC&printsec=frontcover&dq=sisir+kumar+das&hl=en&sa=X&ei=J5ZWUdzDI9GsrAfXwoGwDw&ved=0CD0Q6AEwAg
 https://books.google.com/books?id=bsTNd7_Jt4EC&pg=PA33&dq=sisir+kumar+das&hl=en&sa=X&ei=J5ZWUdzDI9GsrAfXwoGwDw&ved=0CEIQ6AEwAw 
 http://clai.in/sahityavolume1-27feb2011.pdf
 https://www.jstor.org/stable/23341675/
 https://doi.org/10.1177%2F000944558502100103/
 http://www.milansagar.com/kobi/sisirkumar_das/kobi-sisirkumardas.html/

Indian male dramatists and playwrights
20th-century Indian translators
1936 births
2003 deaths
Indian literary historians
Bengali-language writers
Presidency University, Kolkata alumni
University of Calcutta alumni
Delhi University alumni
Academics of SOAS University of London
Academic staff of Delhi University
Scholars from West Bengal
Recipients of the Rabindra Puraskar
English-language writers from India
20th-century Indian poets
20th-century Indian dramatists and playwrights
Indian male poets
Poets from West Bengal
20th-century Indian historians
 Dramatists and playwrights from West Bengal
20th-century Indian male writers